Heroes is a studio album released by English singer Michael Ball. It was released on 14 March 2011 in the United Kingdom by Universal Music TV. The album peaked at number 10 on the UK Albums Chart.

Track listing
All songs produced by Nigel Wright.

Charts

Release history

References

2014 albums
Michael Ball albums
Covers albums